The Corbières Massif is a mountain range in the Pre-Pyrenees. It is the only true foothill of the Pyrenees on their northern side.

Geography
The Corbières are a mountain region in the Languedoc-Roussillon in southeastern France, located in the departements of Aude and Pyrénées-Orientales.

The river Aude borders the Corbières to the west and north, and the river Agly more or less to the south. The eastern border is the Mediterranean Sea. The eastern part of the Corbières bordering the Mediterranean and the Etangs is also known as the Corbières Maritimes, and has a special kind of climate and typical vegetation (thermo-mediterranean vegetation) which cannot be found in the western part.

The highest point of the Corbières is the 1,230 m high Pic de Bugarach.

See also
Geology of the Pyrenees
Pre-Pyrenees

References

Landforms of Aude
Landforms of Pyrénées-Orientales
Pre-Pyrenees
Mountain ranges of Occitania (administrative region)